Sulz is a former municipality in the district of Hochdorf in the canton of Lucerne in Switzerland.  On 1 January 2009, Sulz together with Gelfingen, Hämikon, Mosen, Müswangen, and Retschwil joined Hitzkirch.

Geography
Of this area, 65.1% is used for agricultural purposes, while 29.5% is forested. The rest of the land, (5.4%) is settled.

On 21 May 2006 an attempt to merge the Hitzkirch and the surrounding 10 municipalities failed, when five of the eleven voted against the merger.  A less ambitious merger was then proposed and accepted, with the municipalities of Gelfingen, Hämikon, Mosen, Müswangen, Retschwil and Sulz joining Hitzkirch.  The merged municipality has an area of

Demographics
Sulz has a population of 186, of which 4.3% are foreign nationals.  Over the last 10 years the population has grown at a rate of 2.8%.  Most of the population speaks German  (99.4%), with the rest speaking French (0.6%).

In the 2007 election the most popular party was the CVP which received 39% of the vote.  The next three most popular parties were the FDP (37%), the SVP (19.5%) and the Green Party (1.7%).

The age distribution of the population is children and teenagers (0–19 years old) make up 31.2% of the population, while adults (20–64 years old) make up 60.5% and seniors (over 64 years old) make up 8.3%.  In Sulz about 74.7% of the population (between age 25-64) have completed either non-mandatory upper secondary education or additional higher education (either University or a Fachhochschule).

Sulz has an unemployment rate of 0.09%.  , there were 47 people employed in the primary economic sector and about 16 businesses involved in this sector.  9 people are employed in the secondary sector and there are 3 businesses in this sector.  No one is employed in the tertiary sector, and there are no businesses in this sector.

References

Former municipalities of the canton of Lucerne